Holarrhena pubescens is a species of flowering plant in the family Apocynaceae. It is native to central and southern Africa, the Indian Subcontinent, Indochina, and parts of China.  In Cambodia, it is called /tɨk dɑh kʰlaː thɔm/ ទឹកដោះខ្លាធំ big tiger milk or /kʰlaɛɲ kŭəŋ/ ខ្លែងគង់ invulnerable kite. These seeds are sold as indraja (इनद्राजा) for Ayurvedic medicine in India.

References

Further reading

 

pubescens
Flora of Asia
Flora of Africa